Eugen Koprčina (born 10 September 1996) is a Croatian water polo player. He is currently playing for VK Solaris. He is 6 ft 2 in (1.88 m) tall and weighs 183 lb (83 kg).

References

External links
NOSI IM SE NARANČASTA BOJA Ovo je priča o trojici mladića, darovitim sportašima koji su u Krešimirov grad stigli iz Biograda; U Crnici i na Šubićevcu se osjećaju kao doma

1996 births
Living people
Croatian male water polo players